TAAS may refer to:

 Israel Military Industries, also referred to as Taas (Hebrew: תע"ש), an Israeli weapons manufacturer
 Ta'as, an abbreviation of the Hebrew for "Military Industry" (Hebrew: Ta'asiya Tzvait), the clandestine arms industry of the Jewish settlement in Mandate Palestine
 Taipei Adventist American School, a school in Taipei, Taiwan
 Texas Assessment of Academic Skills, (TAAS), a standardized test used in Texas between 1991 and 2002
 These Arms Are Snakes, an American band
 The Air Ambulance Service, a British charity who operate air ambulances
 Trimeric autotransporter adhesins (TAAs), proteins found on the outer membrane of Gram-negative bacteria
 Transportation as a Service (TaaS)
 Testing as a service (TaaS), software testing provided as a service done by a third party rather than the creator of the software

See also 
 TAA (disambiguation)
 Zee 24 Taas, a 24-hour Marathi news channel